Lullabies for the Dormant Mind is the second studio album by Canadian metal band The Agonist. It was produced by Christian R. Donaldson (Cryptopsy, Mythosis). The album demonstrates a more diverse sound than the Agonist's debut album and features classical, jazz, opera, grindcore, thrash metal, and black metal influences. It features guest violins by Avi Ludmer (Mahogany Rush) and orchestrations by classical pianists Melina Soochan and Jonathan Lefrancois-Leduc (Blackguard). In 2009 the band released two videos from the album, "...And Their Eulogies Sang Me to Sleep" and "Thank You, Pain".

Style
Lullabies for the Dormant Mind contains a wide range of songs including ones described as gothic metal and power metal.

Track listing

Personnel
The Agonist
Alissa White-Gluz – lead vocals
Danny Marino – guitars
Chris Kells – bass, backing vocals
Simon McKay – drums, percussions

Production
Christian Donaldson – producer, mixing, mastering
Youri Raymond (ex-Cryptopsy, Unhuman) – vocals on "...and Their Eulogies Sang Me to Sleep."
Avi Ludmer (Mahogany Rush) – violin
Melina Soochan  – piano
Natalie Shau – artwork
Jonathan Lefrancois-Leduc (Blackguard) – piano

Charts

References

2009 albums
Century Media Records albums
The Agonist albums